The Centre for Education Policy of India (CEPI) is an Indian think-tank on higher education.

CEPI was started as a platform for discussion / debate among various stakeholders in the sector, be it educationalists, experts, students, teachers as well as those in educational governance amongst others. .

Description
CEPI is governed by an advisory group of experts in higher education, who together with other experts share opinions, participate in consultations, produce  White papers and influence public opinion. In addition, CEPI initiates surveys/studies to document the ills of the present system. 

CEPI  is promoted by Kanohar Lal Trust Society (KLTS)a non-profit organization established in 1968 with the primary objective of furthering the access of education to girls and women in Meerut and Village Sonda in the district of Ghaziabad.

References

External links

" 110 institutions"  A pan India independent Examination Commission needed for higher education: CEPI
" 110 institutions" Facebook's Free Basics proposal is misleading & flawed: IIT, IISc faculty

Educational organisations based in India
Think tanks based in India
Education reform